Pygarctia neomexicana is a moth in the family Erebidae. It was described by William Barnes in 1904. It is found in the US states of Texas, Arizona, Colorado, New Mexico and Utah.

Adults are on wing from April to September.

References

Moths described in 1904
Phaegopterina